Ullathai Allitha is a 1996 Indian Tamil-language romantic comedy film directed by Sundar C. The film stars Karthik, Rambha and Goundamani, with Manivannan, Jai Ganesh, Senthil, and Jyothi Meena in supporting roles. It revolves around a man who escapes from his home to avoid a forced marriage, but unknowingly falls in love with the same woman.

Ullathai Allitha is heavily based on the Tamils film Bommalattam (1968) and Sabaash Meena (1958). The film was scored by Sirpy, photographed by U. K. Senthil Kumar and edited by B. S. Vasu, with filming taking place predominantly in the Fernhills Palace, Ooty. It was released on 15 January 1996 and became a commercial success.

Plot 
Raja is the only son of retired military colonel Chandrasekhar, who raises his son very strictly. Chandrasekhar decides to get Raja married to his friend Viswanathan's daughter Indhu. Vishwanathan is one of the richest men in Ooty and is a tea estate owner. Raja misunderstands another girl as Indhu (Chandrasekhar's nephew Shankar switched Indhu's photo with another girl) and decides to run away from Chennai to escape the forced marriage. Unknown to Chandrasekhar, Shankar plans to grab his properties by triggering Raja to leave the house.

Raja runs away and reaches Ooty, where he meets Vasu, a con artist, and despite initial setbacks both become friends. One day, Raja sees Indhu in Ooty and gets attracted towards her, not knowing that she was the girl fixed for him by his father. Raja follows Indhu and finds her home. Later Raja secures a driver job in Viswanathan's home to woo Indhu.

Raja gives his family ring to Vasu to prevent him from disclosing the truth to Viswanathan, but Viswanathan misunderstands that Vasu is Chandrasekhar's son as he wears the ring now. Viswanathan brings Vasu to his home and introduces him as Indhu's fiancé. One day, a gang tries to attack Vasu, but he is saved by Raja, which makes him understand that there is someone looking out to kill him, so Raja decides to remain in the identity of a driver to unearth the reason behind the goons trying to attack him.

Viswanathan informs Chandrasekhar that his son is found but asks him not to come immediately to see him as he dislikes his father. Meanwhile, at Ooty, Raja tries to impress Indhu, while Vasu is attracted towards Viswanathan's personal secretary Meena. Slowly, love blossoms between Indhu and Raja. Suddenly, Chandrasekhar comes to Ooty to Viswanathan's home to meet Raja. A problem erupts as Raja is in the guise of a driver. Both Raja and Vasu try to manage by roaming together for a few days so that they can convince both Viswanathan and Chandrasekhar.

Meanwhile, Shankar gets furious upon knowing that Raja is found. He befriends Kasinathan, who is Viswanathan's twin brother. However, Kasinathan is a criminal who has just been released from jail. They kidnap Viswanathan, and now, Kasinathan comes to Viswanathan's place so that he can enjoy all the properties and wealth. Doubt erupts for Raja and Vasu upon seeing Kasinathan as he spends money lavishly, compared to Viswanathan, who is very stingy.

Raja and Vasu secretly follow Kasinathan and finds the whereabouts of Viswanathan and the plan behind his kidnap. Raja is shocked to see his cousin Shankar there as he is the master brain behind all the events. A hilarious fight follows, where in the end, Shankar and Kasinathan get arrested. It is also revealed that Raja is the son of Chandrasekhar. Raja unites with Indhu, while Vasu unites with Meena.

Cast 
Karthik as Raja
Rambha as Indhu
Goundamani as Vasu
Manivannan as Viswanathan and Kasinathan
Jai Ganesh as Chandrasekar
Senthil as Viswanathan's manager
Pandu as Viswanathan's manager
Jyothi Meena as Meena
Kazan Khan as Shankar
Vichu Vishwanath as Chandrasekar's manager
Karuppu Subbiah as Seth

Production 

The story and screenplay of Ullathai Allitha were written by Sundar C., who also directed, while the dialogues were written by K. Selva Bharathy. The film was produced by N. Prabhavathi, N. Jyothi Lakshmi, N. Vishnuram and N. Raghuram. Sundar said the film was initially planned as a romantic comedy, but as he wrote the script further, it became more of an outright comedy. Vijay was initially offered the lead role, before Karthik was cast. Roja and Ravali were the initial choices for the lead female role, before Rambha was signed on; Roja declined due to scheduling conflicts with Parambarai  and Tamizh Selvan (both 1996). During the making of the film, there was a misunderstanding and subsequent falling out between Rambha and the producer. For the filming of the song "Azhagiya Laila", Rambha wore different dresses for almost every scene, in addition to wigs. Cinematography was handled by U. K. Senthil Kumar, and editing by B. S. Vasu. The film was predominantly shot at the Fernhills Palace, Ooty. The film is heavily based on the Tamil films Sabaash Meena (1958) and Bommalattam (1968), while borrowing scenes from the Hindi film Andaz Apna Apna (1994).

Soundtrack 
The music was composed by Sirpy and lyrics were written by Palani Bharathi. Sundar C. chose Palani Bharathi after being impressed with his work on Pudhiya Mannargal (1994). All the songs from this film were plagiarised from various sources; "Azhagiya Laila" is based on "Ahla Ma Feki" by Hisham Abbas, "I Love You" is based on another Abbas song "Wana Amel Eih", "Adi Anarkali" is based on "In the Summertime" by Mungo Jerry, "Chittu Chittu Kuruvikku" is based on the Pakistani folk song "Laung Gawacha" and "Mama Nee Mama" is based on "Kinna Sohna Tainu" by Nusrat Fateh Ali Khan.

Release and reception 
Ullathai Allitha was released on 15 January 1996, alongside another Karthik-starrer Kizhakku Mugam, and was more successful as the latter was a failure. Ananda Vikatan rated the film 43 out of 100. The critic noted that Sundar deserved appreciation for lifting interesting scenes and ideas from older films and integrating them well in the screenplay in his own style, and the real hero of the film was Manivannan who was surprising with his comedy acting. Idhayan of Indolink wrote, "Though there can be many answers to this question of why the film became a major hit, the basic opinion would be that it was DIFFERENT ! With lots of action and romance movies been feeded to the fans, there is no doubt why a completely different comedy movie stole the show". Kalki gave the film a mixed review, but appreciated the comedy of Goundamani and Manivannan, calling them the film's real stars. The film achieved success after receiving good word-of-mouth reviews from audiences. After a slow start at the box office, the songs' success on television prompted audiences to visit cinemas.

Cancelled sequel 
A year after the success of Ullathai Allitha, Sundar had plans for making a sequel with the same cast returning. Although he prepared the storyline and script, he shelved the project after discussions with fellow actors. The sequel's story involved Raja moving to the United States to get over the supposed demise of Indhu, where he sees a lookalike of Indhu and falls in love with her.

Legacy 
The success of Ullathai Allitha paved way for numerous comedy films in Tamil cinema. The film made Sundar C. as one of the most sought directors. Rambha gained popularity through this film and became one of the leading heroines. The film also made Manivannan as one of the famous comedians. Karthik and Goundamani became one of the famous comic pairs from the film, the pair went on to do many films. Goundamani's dialogue "Yov Military, Nee Enga Ya Inga?" entered Tamil vernacular, often used by people when unexpectedly running into their friends.

The success of the film led Sundar to collaborate with Karthik in subsequent projects – Mettukudi (1996), Unakkaga Ellam Unakkaga (1999), Kannan Varuvaan (2000) and Azhagana Naatkal (2001). Azhagana Naatkal was compared by critics with Ullathai Allitha due to its similarity in sequences and characterisations. Sundar himself listed Ullathai Allitha as one of the favourite films he had directed. Subha J. Rao and K. Jeshi of The Hindu placed the film in league with other successful comedy films like Kadhalikka Neramillai (1964), Thillu Mullu (1981) and Michael Madana Kama Rajan (1990). Rambha, however, lamented that after the film's success it had become mandatory for her to wear a swimsuit in almost every film since.

References

Bibliography

External links 
 

1990s Tamil-language films
1996 films
1996 romantic comedy films
Films directed by Sundar C.
Films scored by Sirpy
Films shot in Ooty
Indian romantic comedy films
Twins in Indian films